Southern University of Science and Technology (SUSTech) ) is a public research university in Nanshan District, Shenzhen, Guangdong, China. It changed its English name from South University of Science and Technology of China (SUSTC) to Southern University of Science and Technology in 2016. 

It is ranked as the 162nd best University in the world and 19th for all of Asia. In Feb 2022, Southern University of Science and Technology and its mathematics subject were selected into the list of "Double First-class" project, and SUSTech has become a Chinese state Double First Class University.

SUSTech also ranked 2nd in the world for Nature Index 2021 Young Universities (Leading 150 Young Universities) and 13rd in China for Nature Index 2022.

According to the Chinese Ministry of Education, SUSTech is a platform to experiment with Chinese higher education reform.

History
SUSTech was established in 2011 by the provincial government of Guangdong with the aim of developing a new type of tertiary education and becoming a world-class research university. It is located in the rapidly-growing tech capital city of Shenzhen.  With the massive investment by the provincial government, the university attracted world-class researchers and was very quickly recognised as an international centre for science and technology research.  Writing about SUSTech, the Times Higher Education  said: "the rapid ascent of SUSTech onto the global stage is remarkable."

Location
SUSTech is located on a large campus covering an area of 1,978,980 m² in the Nanshan District of Shenzhen.  The campus is a mix of modern buildings, streams and tree-lined green space. The university is committed to environmental-friendly policies and aims to have zero carbon emissions.

Academics
The university is organised into two colleges and four schools which in turn are organised into a number of departments.

There is also an Academy for Advanced Interdisciplinary Studies.

Rankings and reputation 

SUSTech has very rapidly been recognised as a world-class university. In the Times Higher Education 2022 survey, it ranked among the Top Ten universities in mainland China. It had the highest citation score in China and was among the top three in the international outlook. It was ranked 162nd among the universities in the world. It was also ranked 19th in Asia and 13rd in the Young University Rankings in 2022. 

The Shanghai Academic Ranking of World Universities 2019 placed SUSTech 1st in China for its quality of research (Field Weighted Citation Impact).

In THE Young Universities Rankings 2021, SUSTech was ranked the top young university in China.

In THE Global University Employability Ranking, SUSTech was ranked 189th in 2020 and improved to 158th in 2021.

In QS World University Ranking 2023, SUSTech was ranked 11th in mainland China, 91st in Asia and 226th in the world.

Nature Index 
Nature Index tracks the affiliations of high-quality scientific articles and presents research outputs by institution and country on monthly basis.

See also 
 List of universities and colleges in Guangdong
 List of universities in China
 Higher education in China

References

External links

 Southern University of Science and Technology
 Southern University of Science and Technology 
 
  

 
Nanshan District, Shenzhen
Universities and colleges in Shenzhen
Educational institutions established in 2009
2009 establishments in China